Giuseppe Palmieri (21 January 1902 - 13 October 1989) was an Italian high jumper and javelin thrower who competed at the 1924 Summer Olympics, than he was also basketball player and coach.

Biography
He won two bronze medal at the Pre-Universiade held in Paris in 1928, and he won seven times the national championships at senior level.

Personal bests
High jump: 1.86 m ( Ascoli Piceno, 17 July 1927)
Javelin throw: 59.68 m ( Bologna, 7 October 1928)
Hammer throw: 30.77 m ( Florence, 6 October 1929)
Discus throw: 36.78 m ( Trento, 5 June 1927)
Shot put: 11.81 m ( Turin, 23 September 1929)
Triple jump: 12.60 m ( Cesena, 6 September 1925)
Pole vault: 3.00 m ( Genoa, 13 April 1924)
Decathlon: 5755.985 pts ( Genoa, 12–13 April 1924)

Achievements

National titles
Italian Athletics Championships
High jump: 1924, 1925, 1926, 1927, 1928 (5)
Javelin throw: 1925, 1929 (2)

See also
 Men's high jump Italian record progression

References

External links
 
 Giuseppe Palmieri at Virtuspedia

1902 births
1989 deaths
Athletes (track and field) at the 1924 Summer Olympics
Italian male high jumpers
Italian male javelin throwers
Italian men's basketball players
Italian basketball coaches
Olympic athletes of Italy
20th-century Italian people